Buffalo High School is a high school in Buffalo, West Virginia, United States, serving the northern part of Putnam County, including Eleanor. It is a part of Putnam County Schools.

The school colors are blue and gold, and the athletic mascot and nickname are the Bison. Sometimes sports scores refer to the school as "Buffalo-Putnam" or "Buffalo of Putnam" because there used to be another Buffalo High School in Wayne County, but this practice fell into disuse after Buffalo-Wayne High School was consolidated with Vinson High School and Ceredo-Kenova High School to form Spring Valley High School for the 1999 academic year. 

The school has approximately 340 students, placing it in Class A for sports.  This is far smaller than the other three schools in the county, and for years the county attempted to close the school. However, this was always defeated by voters.  A new building was finished in 2012, insuring the continued existence of the school.

The school is a partner with the Toyota Motor Corporation, which has a major plant in Buffalo.

External links
 

Public high schools in West Virginia
Buildings and structures in Putnam County, West Virginia
Education in Putnam County, West Virginia